Kavignar Meenavan (கவிஞர் மீனவன், 9 January 1933 – 22 August 2012), born R.K. Narayanasamy, was a Tamil poet, writer and activist.
He was called Kavignar Meenavan by the people of Nagapattinam. He was a popular scholar and has written lot of poetry and research articles in Tamil language.

Early life
He was born in Tranquebar to Kula Lakkuvan and Thailammai as a First child. Worked as a school teacher in different places, and retired as a Tamil teacher from National Higher Secondary School, Nagapattinam, Tamil Nadu. His birth name is R.K. Narayanasamy and a known follower of Thanthai Periyar.

Literary works
Kavignar Meenavan penned his works under different pseudonyms.

He wrote the following books:
 Konjum Kulanthai கொஞ்சும் குழந்தை (a poetry collection)
 Uzhaikkum Parithi உழைக்கும் பரிதி (a poetry collection)
 Mutthiraikkumari முத்திரைக்குமரி (a poetry collection)
 Sinthanai Sirpi Singaravelar Pillai Thamizh சிந்தனைச்சிற்பி சிங்காரவேலர் பிள்ளைத்தமிழ்
 Pandaiya Thamizharum Parathavar Vaazhvum பண்டைய தமிழரும் பரதவர் வாழ்வும்

Awards
 Awarded First prize for his Poetry Collection Konjum Kuzhanthai by Chief Minister Kalaignar Karunanidhi in the year 1975

References 

1933 births
2012 deaths
Tamil writers